"Comedown" is a song by British rock band Bush, released on 26 September 1995 as the third single from their debut album, Sixteen Stone.

Composition

Gavin Rossdale wrote the song about an ex-girlfriend, stating, "It was written in the context of half regret, half celebration and just being objective about the situation of coming down from that high and dealing with those intense emotions." In 2017 he added:

Drummer Robin Goodridge told music publication Modern Drummer that the bass line and drum grooves in "Comedown" were borrowed from a song by English band Massive Attack.

Of the 12 songs featured on Sixteen Stone, "Comedown" was the first to be written, and remains unchanged lyrically from its original form.

Music video
The music video was directed by Jake Scott in Los Angeles. Scott used a special "fish eye" lens to film some of the scenes, to give a distorted view as if looking through a peep hole.

Commercial performance
"Comedown" remains one of the band's most commercially successful songs, reaching number one on the Billboard Alternative Songs chart and number two on the Billboard Mainstream Rock Tracks chart in late 1995. The song also gave Bush their first American top 40 hit, reaching number 30 on the Billboard Hot 100 on 4 November 1995.

Track listing
 AUS CD single 6544-95728-2 (cardsleeve version)
 "Comedown"
 "Comedown [acoustic]"
 AUS CD single IND95728 (jewel case version)
 "Comedown"
 "Testosterone [LP version]"
 "Revolution Blues [live]"

Appearances in the media
The song appeared in the video game Guitar Hero 5 and TV show Animal Kingdom in addition to Rock Band 3 as downloadable content.
Along with "Machinehead", "Comedown" appears in the 1996 film Fear. It can be heard over Nicole's second date with David, after he picks her up from school to play billiards.
Along with "Glycerine", the band performed the song on Saturday Night Live in 1995.
Pro wrestler Chris Kanyon used an instrumental edit of the song in the last days of World Championship Wrestling in 2001.
In 2006, CBC used the song in their closing montage of the Stanley Cup Playoffs.

Chart positions

Cover versions
 In 2010, Mono Inc released an EP with Comedown on it.  Comedown was also featured on their Symphonies Of Pain compilation album in 2017.
 In 2012 Robert Cole Band released a cover on the album Steel and Glass.
 In 2014 Mayday Parade released a cover for the compilation Punk Goes 90's 2. It was released as a single.

References

External links
 

1994 songs
1995 singles
Bush (British band) songs
Songs written by Gavin Rossdale
Song recordings produced by Clive Langer
Song recordings produced by Alan Winstanley
Music videos directed by Jake Scott (director)
Interscope Records singles
Trauma Records singles
Atlantic Records singles
Grunge songs